Kendriya Vidyalaya Sevoke Road is a school in the city of Siliguri, West Bengal, India, offering both primary and secondary education. The school is situated in Salugara locality, in the foothills of Himalayas. It is affiliated to the Central Board of Secondary Education, and run by Kendriya Vidyalaya Sangathan. It was built in defence land, and opened in the year 1981. Later the school was shifted to a new building few hundred metres away.

Infrastructure facilities 
There are total of 34 classrooms in the school. 3 sections up to class X and 1 in each stream in Class XI and XII. Science, Commerce and Humanities streams are available in higher secondary. There are also facilities for indoor and outdoor games.

Other Activities 
CMP, CCA, KVS National Sports Meet, Scout & Guides

Connections 
The only connection to the school is via Sevoke Road or NH10 (old NH31). Autos and Rickshaws are available.

See also
Education in India
List of schools in India
Education in West Bengal
List of Kendriya Vidyalayas

References

External links

Schools in West Bengal
Siliguri
1981 establishments in West Bengal
Educational institutions established in 1981